Dragan Dimić (born October 14, 1981 in Gnjilane, Kosovo) is a Serbian football player.

External links
 

Living people
1981 births
Serbian footballers
Serbian expatriate footballers
Austrian Football Bundesliga players
FK Austria Wien players
Association football forwards
J2 League players
Japan Football League players
FC Machida Zelvia players
Expatriate footballers in Austria
Expatriate footballers in Japan